"Whatcha Gonna Do?" is a song by American rock group Pablo Cruise.  This song was written by David Jenkins and Cory Lerios, two of the band's members.  "Whatcha Gonna Do?" was a track from their album A Place in the Sun in 1977.

Chart performance
It was released as a single and reached #6 on the Billboard Hot 100. "Whatcha Gonna Do" was also a minor hit on the Billboard's Hot Soul Singles chart, where it peaked at #46.

In Canada, "Whatcha Gonna Do?" reached #1 on the pop singles chart.  It is ranked as the 24th biggest Canadian hit of 1977.
Billboard ranked it as the #16 song of 1977.

Chart history

Weekly charts

Year-end charts

References

External links
 Lyrics of this song
 

1977 songs
1977 singles
Pablo Cruise songs
Songs written by David Jenkins (musician)
A&M Records singles
RPM Top Singles number-one singles